The Train Warning System in India is a device that helps prevent trains passing signals at stop. The system is an implementation of Level 1 ERTMS.

See also
 Anti-collision device
 Automatic Train Protection
 ETCS

References

External links
 EFYTimes

Railway signalling in India
Train protection systems